The 1926 Wightman Cup was the fourth edition of the annual women's team tennis competition between the United States and Great Britain. It was held at the All England Lawn Tennis and Croquet Club in London in England.

See also
 1926 Davis Cup

References

1926
1926 in tennis
1926 in American tennis
1926 in British sport
1926 in women's tennis